Paul Heald (born 20 September 1968 in Wath-on-Dearne) is a former professional footballer who played as a goalkeeper for Milton Keynes Dons, Wimbledon, Leyton Orient and Sheffield United. He also had loan spells with Coventry City, Crystal Palace, Swindon Town and Sheffield Wednesday.

Playing career

Leyton Orient
Heald started his career at Sheffield United in 1987 and moved on to Leyton Orient where he made a total of 176 league appearances. Heald also had loan spells at Coventry, Crystal Palace and newly promoted Swindon Town. He was one of four goalkeepers used by Swindon during their Premier League season alongside Fraser Digby, Jon Sheffield and Nick Hammond.

Wimbledon
In 1995 a £125,000 fee took him to the Premier League side Wimbledon, where he acted mainly as backup for first Hans Segers and then Neil Sullivan. He played a total of 38 league games for the club.

In his first season at Wimbledon he was the goalkeeper who was unable to stop Tony Yeboah's famous strike in September 1995, the goal going on to win the BBC Goal of the Season.

Heald had a brief spell on loan with Sheffield Wednesday in 2002. He stayed with Wimbledon until the club's demise and replacement with a team based in Milton Keynes in 2003. He remained a player with the new Milton Keynes Dons until his retirement in 2005.

Coaching career
Since retiring, Heald has continued as goalkeepers coach for Milton Keynes Dons until leaving in 2019.

References

External links

1968 births
Living people
English footballers
Association football goalkeepers
Premier League players
Wimbledon F.C. players
Leyton Orient F.C. players
Milton Keynes Dons F.C. players
Milton Keynes Dons F.C. non-playing staff
Sheffield United F.C. players
Coventry City F.C. players
Crystal Palace F.C. players
Swindon Town F.C. players
Sheffield Wednesday F.C. players